The Bakelite Museum is a collection of Bakelite and other articles belonging to Patrick Cook that is currently looking for new premises.

History
It began as an art installation in London galleries in the 1970s and was opened as a museum in Greenwich in 1983. It includes vintage plastics such as radios, cameras, telephones, Bayko play bricks and a Bakelite coffin. The Bakelite era is also represented by non-plastic objects from the early 20th century – fridges, cookers, washing-machines, toasters and comptometers. An additional feature is the contents of one of the first, pioneering Bakelite factories in Britain, with presses, moulding machines and original steel moulds.

After 25 years in an 18th century watermill in Williton, Somerset, England, the collection was moved into storage.  It is now under the auspices of a charitable trust, the Bakelite Design Trust, whose aim is to establish a new museum to show the collection in an urban location accessible to all.

See also 
Leo Baekeland, inventor of Bakelite

References

External links 
 Article about the museum with photos
 Article about the museum with photos
 Bakelite! (youtube)
 Other Bakelite museums

Museums in Somerset
Grade II listed buildings in West Somerset
Decorative arts museums in England
Watermills in Somerset
Grade II listed museum buildings
Grade II listed watermills